The Girl from Missouri is an EP and the debut release by then British group No Man Is an Island, which would later reduce as a duo known simply as No-Man. Only 500 copies were made.

With the exception of the title track, all the songs were later included in the Speak cassette released in 1993, while only "The Ballet Beast" and "Night Sky Sweat Earth" made it to the commercial 1999 CD re-release (albeit with resung vocals).

Track listing

External links

http://www.voyage-pt.de/swdisco.pdf

1989 debut EPs
No-Man albums